Bianca Matte (Roraima, October 13, 1990) is a Brazilian beauty queen and holder of the titles of Miss Roraima 2013 and Miss Brazilian Tourism 2014.

Bianca represented the state of Roraima at the Miss Brasil 2013, winner of Miss Tourism Brazil Universe 2014 and 2nd runner up at Miss Tourism Universe 2014, when she won the prize as the best costume of the night.

Biography 
Bianca Matte is a Brazilian model.

Worked as model in China and Turkey between 2010 and 2013.

She started to participate in beauty pageants at 2013, when she won Miss Roraima 2013. Months later, she represented her state at Miss Brasil 2013.

In November 21, 2014, she participated of Miss Tourism Universe, a beauty pageant that happened at Beirut, in Lebanon, and she was the 2nd runner up among other 27 contestants. The winner of Miss Tourism Universe 2014 was the Venezuelan Ninoska Vásquez

References

External links

 
 

1990 births
Living people
Brazilian beauty pageant winners
Brazilian female models
People from Roraima
Brazilian people of German descent